Björn Ragnar Weckström (born February 8, 1935) is a Finnish sculptor and jewelry designer. He graduated from Helsinki Goldsmith’s school in 1956. Since the very beginning of his career, Weckström has been a highly ambitious designer and artist. At first, his works represented a clean Scandinavian style, but in the 1960s Weckström found his own, a totally new style which is closer to sculpture than traditional goldsmithing.

Jewelry and glass 
Rough matt surfaces, uncut semi-precious stones and asymmetrical forms are typical to his massive golden jewelry. Inspiration comes often from nature. When working in silver, Weckström can for example portray the snowy, Finnish winter landscape with its frozen lakes. Weckström considers jewelry as an art form and his designs as miniature sculptures.

In 1963 Björn Weckström started co-operation with jewelry manufacturer Kruunu-Koru Oy (later Lapponia Jewelry) and its owner Pekka Anttila. Weckström became company’s designer and art director. In 1965 Weckström took part in the International Jewelry Contest in Rio de Janeiro, where his yellowgold and tourmaline necklace “Flowering wall” won the Grand Prix. Through this distinguished award, the company received worldwide recognition, launching Lapponia’s international success. His designs have been in continuous production with Lapponia ever since.

Probably the best-known piece of Weckström’s jewelry is necklace Planetoid Valleys which Princess Leia (Carrie Fisher) wore in George Lucas’ film Star Wars in 1977. Necklace was designed for Lapponia in 1969. 

Björn Weckström was the first designer who radically combined silver and acrylic in jewelry. Especially silver-acrylic ring Petrified lake achieved international attention when Yoko Ono was filmed wearing it on the Dick Cavett Show in 1975

For Nuutajärvi glass factory Weckström has designed, inter alia, glassware series “Kanerva” and “Fortuna” and produced dozens of unique glassworks together with factory’s glassblowers. In 2010s he has worked together with glassblower master Kari Alakoski.

Sculpture
The artistic walk of life of sculptor Bjorn Weckstrom is characterised by impressive series of work, shaped in materials such as bronze, marble, glass and acrylic resin, as well as in often surprising combinations of the above. 

The invitation to become a lecturer at the University of Pisa in 1979, led to an important change in his life: thereafter Weckström spent the majority of his time in Italy for 30 years. Inspired by Riace bronzes 1980 Weckström started to make narrative bronze sculptures. His distinctive language of expression ranges from abstract form to an individualistic interpretation of realism. Central to the bronze sculptures has been the reinterpretation of classic Greek mythology. Furthermore, the large sculptures, exploring the interaction between man and machine, outline a profound analysis of the current state of Mankind.

Public commissions 
 HYY Group, Kaivopiha, Helsinki: sculpture “Together” 2018
 "The whistling City-dweller"-sculpture, Helsinki 1995
 YLE Headquarters, Helsinki 1993: sculpture "Narcissos" 1993
 Monument in honour of Fazer's 100th Anniversary, Helsinki: "Fazer's rooster" 1991
 Fazer Headquarters, Vantaa: sculpture "Domina" 1989
 Wallrelief for Rettig Strengberg, Turku 1986

Honours 

 Cavaliere Ordine della Stella d’Italia 2017
 Espoo City Medal 2016
 Professor’s title 1986
 Pro Finlandia medal 1971
 Medal for merit no. 22 of the Finnish Goldsmiths' Association 1967
 Winner of the Lunning Prize

Exhibitions 
More than 60 exhibitions in Europe, USA, Australia and Asia in 1963–2016

Björn Weckström is said to be one of the most charismatic and cosmopolitan personalities of the Finnish art world. Nowadays Björn Weckström lives in Espoo, Finland, but travels to Italy several times a year. He has an atelier both in Finland and in Italy. Bazar publishers has published Weckström’s autobiography Mitt liv som Björn in 2018.

References 

1935 births
Living people
20th-century Finnish sculptors
21st-century Finnish sculptors